"Oh Me, Oh My, Sweet Baby" is a song written by Michael Garvin and Tom Shapiro. It was first recorded in 1989 by George Strait and featured on his album Beyond the Blue Neon.

Diamond Rio version

It was later recorded and released as a single by American country music group Diamond Rio.  It was released in March 1993 as the second single from their album Close to the Edge.  It peaked at number 5 in the United States, and number 8 in Canada. In 1997, Eddie Blazonczyk and The Versatones released a polka version of the song.

Chart performance

Year-end charts

References

1989 songs
1993 singles
George Strait songs
Diamond Rio songs
Songs written by Michael Garvin
Songs written by Tom Shapiro
Song recordings produced by Jimmy Bowen
Arista Nashville singles